Hearty is a surname of Irish origin, being a variant of the surname Harty. Notable people with the surname include:

Hugh Hearty (1912-1939), Scottish professional footballer
Paul Hearty (born 1978), Irish Gaelic footballer

See also
Hearty White (born 1964), American radio host and musician
HMS Hearty, the name of several ships of the Royal Navy
Hearty elimia, an extinct species of freshwater snail
Hearty Mart, a rural and semi-urban retail chain
Hearty and Hellish!, a live album of Irish folk songs
Harty (surname)